Parral may refer to:

El Parral, Chiapas, Mexico
El Parral, Avila, Spain
Parral, Chihuahua, Mexico
Parral, Chile
Parral, Peru
The village and monastery of Santa Maria del Parral, near Segovia, Spain 
Parral (vine system), a vine training system
Parral, nickname of Geraldo José da Silva Filho